The Midland Main Line is a major railway line in England from London to Sheffield in Yorkshire via the East Midlands. It comprises the lines from London's St Pancras station via Leicester, Derby/Nottingham and Chesterfield.

Express passenger services on the line are operated by East Midlands Railway. The line is electrified between St Pancras and Corby, and the section south of Bedford forms a branch of the northern half of the Thameslink network, with a semi-fast service to Brighton and other suburban services. A northern part of the route, between Derby and Chesterfield, also forms part of the Cross Country Route operated by CrossCountry. Tracks from Nottingham to Leeds via Barnsley and Sheffield are shared with Northern. East Midlands Railway also operates regional and local services using parts of the line.

The Midland Main Line is undergoing a major upgrade of new digital signalling and full line electrification from London to Sheffield. HS2 is to branch onto the Midland Main Line at East Midlands Parkway railway station.

History

Midland Counties early developments

The Midland Main Line was built in stages between the 1830s and the 1870s. The earliest section was opened by the Midland Counties Railway between Nottingham and Derby on 4 June 1839. On 5 May 1840 the section of the route from Trent Junction to Leicester was opened.

The line at Derby was joined on 1 July 1840 by the North Midland Railway to Leeds Hunslet Lane via Chesterfield, Rotherham Masborough, Swinton, and Normanton.

On 10 May 1844 the North Midland Railway, the Midland Counties Railway and the Birmingham and Derby Junction Railway merged to form the Midland Railway.

Midland Main Line southern extensions

By the 1850s, the junction at Rugby had become severely congested. The Midland Railway employed Thomas Brassey to construct a new route from Leicester to  via Kettering, Wellingborough, and Bedford giving access to London via the Great Northern Railway from Hitchin. The Crimean War resulted in a shortage of labour and finance, and only £900,000 was available for the construction, approximately £15,000 for each mile. To reduce construction costs, the railway followed natural contours, resulting in many curves and gradients. Seven bridges and one tunnel were required, with 60 ft cuttings at Desborough and Sharnbrook. This route opened for coal traffic on 15 April 1857, goods on 4 May, and passengers on 8 May. The section between Leicester and Bedford is still part of the Midland Main Line.

While this took some of the pressure off the route through Rugby, the GNR insisted that passengers for London alight at Hitchin, buying tickets in the short time available, to catch a GNR train to finish their journey. James Allport arranged a seven-year deal with the GN to run into Kings Cross for a guaranteed £20,000 a year. Through services to London were introduced in February 1858.

The construction of the London extension cost £9 million (equivalent to £ million in ).

As traffic built up, the Midland Railway opened a new deviation just north of Market Harborough railway station on 26 June 1885 to remove the flat crossing of the Rugby and Stamford Railway.

Northernmost sections

Plans by the Midland Railway to build a direct line from Derby to Manchester were thwarted in 1863 by the builders of the Buxton line who sought to monopolise on the West Coast Main Line.

In 1870, the Midland Railway opened a new route from Chesterfield to Rotherham which went through Sheffield via the Bradway Tunnel.

The mid-1870s, saw the Midland line extended northwards through the Yorkshire Dales and Eden Valley on what is now called the Settle–Carlisle Railway.

Before the line closures of the Beeching era, the lines to Buxton and via Millers Dale during most years presented an alternate (and competing) main line from London to Manchester, carrying named expresses such as The Palatine and the "Blue Pullman" diesel powered Manchester - London service (the Midland Pullman). Express trains to Leeds and Scotland such as the Thames–Clyde Express mainly used the Midland's corollary Erewash Valley line, returned to it, and then used the Settle–Carlisle line. Expresses to Edinburgh Waverley, such as The Waverley travelled through Corby and Nottingham.

Under British Railways and privatisation

Most Leicester-Nottingham local passenger trains were taken over by diesel units from 14 April 1958, taking about 51 minutes between the two cities.

When the Great Central Main Line closed in 1966, the Midland Main Line became the only direct main-line rail link between London and the East Midlands and parts of South Yorkshire.

The Beeching cuts and electrification of the West Coast Main Line brought an end to the marginally longer London–Manchester service via Sheffield.

In 1977, the Parliamentary Select Committee on Nationalised Industries recommended considering electrification of more of Britain's rail network, and by 1979 BR presented a range of options that included electrifying the Midland Main Line from London to Yorkshire by 2000. By 1983, the line had been electrified from Moorgate to Bedford, but proposals to continue electrification to Nottingham and Sheffield were not implemented.

In January 2009, a new station, East Midlands Parkway, was opened between Loughborough and Trent Junction, to act as a park-and-ride station for suburban travellers from East Midlands cities and to serve nearby East Midlands Airport.

Since then,  running has been introduced on extended stretches. Improved signalling, increased number of tracks, and the revival of proposals to extend electrification from Bedford to Sheffield are underway. Much of this £70 million upgrade, including some line-speed increases, came online on 9 December 2013 (see below).

Network Rail route strategy for freight 2007
Network Rail published a Route Utilisation Strategy for freight in 2007; over the coming years a cross-country freight route will be developed enhancing the Birmingham to Peterborough Line, increasing capacity through Leicester, and remodelling Syston and Wigston junctions.

Network Rail 2010 route plan

Traffic levels on the Midland Main Line are rising faster than the national average, with continued increases predicted. In 2006, the Strategic Rail Authority produced a Route Utilisation Strategy for the Midland Main Line to propose ways of meeting this demand; Network Rail started a new study in February 2008 and this was published in February 2010.

After electrification, the North Northamptonshire towns (Wellingborough, Kettering, and Corby) are planned to have an additional 'Outer Suburban service' into London St Pancras, similar to the West Midlands Trains' Crewe – London Euston services, to cater for the growing commuter market. North Northamptonshire is a major growth area, with over 7,400 new homes planned to be built in Wellingborough and 5,500 new homes planned for Kettering.

Highlights include:
Work related to line speed increases, removing foot crossings and replacing with footbridges
Capacity enhancements for freight
Re-signalling of the entire route, expected to be complete by 2016 when all signalling will be controlled by the East Midlands signalling centre in Derby
Rebuilding Bedford and Leicester
Upgraded approach signalling (flashing yellow aspects) added at key junctions – Radlett, Harpenden, and Leagrave allowing trains to traverse them at higher speeds
Lengthening of platforms at Wellingborough, Kettering, Market Harborough, Loughborough, Long Eaton, and Beeston stations as well as work related to the Thameslink Programme (see below)
Realignment of the track and construction of new platforms to increase the permissible speed through Market Harborough station from 60 mph to 85 mph saving 30–60 seconds
Electrification (see below)
Re-doubling the Kettering to Oakham Line between Kettering North Junction and Corby as well as re-signalling to Syston Junction via Oakham, allowing a half hourly London to Corby passenger service (from an infrastructure perspective) from December 2017 and creating additional paths for rail freight.

Thameslink Programme

The Thameslink Programme has lengthened the platforms at most stations south of Bedford to 12-car capability. St Pancras, Cricklewood, Hendon, and Luton Airport Parkway were already long enough, but bridges at Kentish Town mean it cannot expand beyond the current 8-car platform length. West Hampstead Thameslink has a new footbridge and a new station building. In September 2014 the current Thameslink Great Northern franchise was awarded and trains on this route are currently operated by Thameslink. In 2018 the Thameslink network will expand when some Southern services are merged into it.

Station improvements
In 2013/14  station was refurbished and the platforms restructured.

As part of Wellingborough's Stanton Cross development,  station is to be expanded.

Two new stations are planned: 
 between Cricklewood and Hendon as part of the Brent Cross Cricklewood development in North London.
Expected to be built by 2015, scheduled for 2019, but now expected to be 2024.

Some new stations have been proposed:
Clay Cross between Chesterfield and Ambergate/Alferton. 
Irchester between Wellingborough and Bedford.
Ampthill between Bedford and Flitwick.

Extension of electrification

 
Unlike the West Coast and East Coast Main Lines, the Midland Main Line has not been electrified along its full length. The line was electrified as far as Bedford in the early 1980s, but services relied on diesel traction beyond that.

In 2011 work commenced to extend the electrification, including to both Corby and Nottingham. Increasing costs initially saw this terminated at Kettering, but it was later extended to Market Harborough.

In May 2022, a briefing to contractors was released ahead of an invitation to tender for Midland Mainline Electrification project work to extend electrification to Nottingham and Sheffield. This scheme is expected to cost £1.3 billion.

2021 Integrated Rail Plan

In November 2021 the Government announced its Integrated Rail Plan for the North and Midlands which made a number of proposals for the Midland Main Line. These included a commitment to complete the stalled electrification work, an upgrade to digital signalling, and a connection to High Speed 2. The latter would see a junction built south of East Midlands Parkway station rather than the previous plan of an East Midlands Hub further north on the Toton sidings. This will allow HS2 services to connect to both Derby and Nottingham city centres directly using the MML for access, which was a criticism of the previous HS2 eastern leg proposal.

Route definition
The term Midland Main Line has been used from the late 1840s to describe any route of the Midland Railway on which express trains were operated.

It is first recorded in print in 1848 in Bradshaw's railway almanack of that year. In 1849 it begins to be mentioned regularly in newspapers such as the Derby Mercury.

In 1867, the Birmingham Journal uses the term to describe the new railway running into St Pancras railway station.

In 1868, the term was used to describe the Midland Railway main route from North to South through Sheffield and also on routes to Manchester, Leeds and Carlisle.

Under British Rail the term was used to define the route between St Pancras and Sheffield, but since then, Network Rail has restricted it in its description of Route 19 to the lines between St. Pancras and Chesterfield.

Accidents 
 26 September 1860 Bull bridge accident; bridge collapse
 2 September 1861 Kentish Town rail accident; collision
 2 September 1898 Wellingborough rail accident; derailment due to post trolley on track
 24 December 1910 Hawes Junction rail crash; signalman forgot about train
 2 September 1913 Ais Gill rail accident; collision
 3 December 1923 Nunnery Colliery
 13 December 1926 Orgreave Paddy Mail accident
 1 February 2008 Barrow upon Soar rail accident

Operators

East Midlands Railway
EMR use  Meridian and Class 180 Adelante trains in various carriage formations for its InterCity services.

EMR also operate a twice hourly commuter service from London St Pancras to Corby, which is branded as EMR Connect, using Class 360 Desiro electric trains.

Thameslink
Thameslink provides frequent, 24-hour commuter services south of Bedford as part of its Thameslink route to London Bridge, and Sutton, using 8-car and 12-car electric  trains.

Other operators
CrossCountry runs half-hourly services between Derby and Sheffield on its route between the South West and North East, and hourly services from Nottingham to Birmingham and Cardiff. Northern runs an hourly service from Leeds to Nottingham via Barnsley and Alfreton. 

Other operators include TransPennine Express in the Sheffield area.

Route description
The cities, towns and villages served by the MML are listed below. Stations in bold have a high usage. This table includes the historical extensions to Manchester (where it linked to the West Coast Main Line) and Carlisle (via Leeds where it meets with the 'modern' East Coast Main Line).

Network Rail groups all lines in the East Midlands and the route north as far as Chesterfield and south to London as route 19. The actual line extends beyond this into routes 10 and 11.

London to Nottingham and Sheffield (Network Rail Route 19)

Tunnels, viaducts and major bridges 
Major civil engineering structures on the Midland Main Line include the following.

Line-side monitoring equipment 
Line-side train monitoring equipment includes hot axle box detectors (HABD) and wheel impact load detectors (WILD) ‘Wheelchex’, these are located as follows.

Ambergate Junction to Manchester

For marketing and franchising, this is no longer considered part of the Midland Main Line: see Manchester, Buxton, Matlock and Midlands Junction Railway

The line was once the Midland Railway's route from London St Pancras to Manchester, branching at Ambergate Junction along the Manchester, Buxton, Matlock and Midlands Junction Railway, now known as the Derwent Valley line.
In days gone by, it featured named expresses such as The Palatine. Much later in the twentieth century, it carried the Midland Pullman.

A section of the route remains in the hands of the Peak Rail preservation group, operating between Matlock and Rowsley to the north.

Leeds to Carlisle
For marketing and franchising, this is no longer considered part of the Midland Main Line: see Settle–Carlisle Railway.

World War I prevented the Midland Railway from finishing its direct route through the West Riding to join the Settle and Carlisle (which would have cut six miles from the journey and avoided the need for reversal at Leeds).

The first part of the Midland's West Riding extension from the main line at Royston (Yorks.) to Dewsbury was opened before the war.  However, the second part of the extension was not completed. 
This involved a viaduct at Dewsbury over the River Calder, a tunnel under Dewsbury Moor and a new approach railway into Bradford from the south at a lower level than the existing railway (a good part of which was to be in tunnel) leading into Bradford Midland (or Bradford Forster Square) station.

The  gap between the stations at Bradford still exists. Closing it today would also need to take into account the different levels between the two Bradford stations, a task made easier in the days of electric rather than steam traction, allowing for steeper gradients than possible at the time of the Midland's proposed extension.

Two impressive viaducts remain on the completed part of the line between Royston Junction and Dewsbury as a testament to the Midland's ambition to complete a third direct Anglo-Scottish route. The line served two goods stations and provided a route for occasional express passenger trains before its eventual closure in 1968.

The failure to complete this section ended the Midland's hopes of being a serious competitor on routes to Scotland and finally put beyond all doubt that Leeds, not Bradford, would be the West Riding's principal city. Midland trains to Scotland therefore continued to call at Leeds before travelling along the Aire Valley to the Settle and Carlisle. From Carlisle they then travelled onwards via either the Glasgow and South Western or Waverley Route. In days gone by the line enjoyed named expresses such as the Thames–Clyde Express and The Waverley.

  along the Airedale line
 Here is Apperley Junction for the Wharfedale line
 : here is the triangular junction for the branch line serving  
 
 
  
 
  
 
 
 Here is Settle Junction for the line to Morecambe

 
 Here was the junction for Ingleton and an end-on junction via Sedbergh to Low Gill on the London and North Western Railway (LNW) West Coast Main Line
 
  
 At this point the line divided: a triangular junction for the two lines:

, including a station for Middleton Road Heysham
 
 
 
  
  
 At Hawes station, on the branch to the east of the main line, there was an end-on junction with the North Eastern Railway (NER) line across the Pennines to 
  
 Appleby

Former stations
As with most railway lines in Britain, the route used to serve far more stations than it currently does (and consequently passes close to settlements that it no longer serves).  Places that the current main line used to serve include

See also
 Midland Main Line railway upgrade
 Great Central Main Line – Former competing main line
 East Coast Main Line
 West Coast Main Line
 Great Western Main Line
 Highland Main Line

Notes and references
Notes 

References

External links

Rail transport in Hertfordshire
Rail transport in Bedfordshire
Rail transport in Northamptonshire
Rail transport in Leicestershire
Rail transport in Derby
Rail transport in Derbyshire
Rail transport in Nottinghamshire
Rail transport in South Yorkshire
Rail transport in West Yorkshire
Railway lines in the East Midlands
Railway lines in Yorkshire and the Humber
Railway lines in London
Transport in the London Borough of Camden
Transport in the London Borough of Barnet
Main inter-regional railway lines in Great Britain
Standard gauge railways in England